Stella K. Abraham High School for Girls is a Modern Orthodox Jewish day school, a college preparatory high school for grades 9-12, located in Hewlett Bay Park in Nassau County, New York, United States.

The school is part of the Hebrew Academy of Long Beach which purchased the former Lawrence Country Day School  campus in 1992 for $2.2 million. Academics at the school focuses both on the Limudei Kodesh (Torah studies) curriculum and in secular non-Jewish studies. The school is accredited by the New York State Board of Regents and has been accredited by the Middle States Association of Colleges and Schools since 1999. It was renamed for longtime resident Stella K. Abraham in 1994.

History

In 1992, The Hebrew Academy's purchase of the site in Hewlett Bay Park caused controversy when the village sought to acquire the property through eminent domain, leading to accusations of antisemitism. A $55.0 million civil rights lawsuit was filed and after nearly two years, a compromise was reached allowing the school to operate but limiting its size and the suit was dropped.

See also 
 List of high schools in New York

References

External links 
 
 PrivateSchoolReview.com
 Siemens Westinghouse National Competition Winners pdf document

1992 establishments in New York (state)
Girls' schools in New York (state)
Private high schools in New York (state)
Modern Orthodox Jewish day schools in the United States
Educational institutions established in 1992
Schools in Nassau County, New York
Orthodox Jewish schools for women